Jury Dimitri Chechi  (born 11 October 1969) is a retired Italian gymnast.

Biography
Chechi was named after cosmonaut Yuri Gagarin. He won the Olympics title in the rings at Atlanta 1996 and was third at Athens 2004. Chechi's bronze was the result of his attempted comeback into the sport at the age of 35, well above what is considered the average age of a male gymnast.

Chechi dominated his specialty, the rings, during the nineties, so he was nicknamed "the Lord of the Rings"; however, he could not participate in the Barcelona 1992 and Sydney 2000 Olympic games due to serious injuries. He has won five gold and two bronze medals at the World Gymnastics Championships and four gold and two bronze medals at the European Championships.

Chechi was the Italian flagbearer at the opening ceremony in the Athens Games in 2004. He also participated in the 2006 Winter Olympics opening ceremony in Turin.

Jury sparked some controversy at the 2004 Athens Olympic games when he shook the hand of Silver medalist in the rings final, Yordan Yovchev and signaled that he should have won the gold medal, not Dimosthenis Tampakos (meaning that he won only because he was the local champion).

He is an atheist.

Honours of merit
  3rd Class / Commander: Commendatore Ordine al Merito della Repubblica Italiana
— 27 September 2004. Initiative by President of the Italian Republic Carlo Azeglio Ciampi.

See also
Italian men gold medalist at the Olympics and World Championships

References

External links
 
   

1969 births
Living people
Italian male artistic gymnasts

Italian atheists
Olympic gymnasts of Italy
Olympic gold medalists for Italy
Olympic bronze medalists for Italy
Gymnasts at the 1988 Summer Olympics
Gymnasts at the 1996 Summer Olympics
Gymnasts at the 2004 Summer Olympics
World champion gymnasts
Medalists at the World Artistic Gymnastics Championships
People from Prato
Olympic medalists in gymnastics
European champions in gymnastics
Universiade medalists in gymnastics
Universiade gold medalists for Italy
Universiade silver medalists for Italy
Medalists at the 1996 Summer Olympics
Medalists at the 2004 Summer Olympics